Thomas Renfrew, CBE (18 June 1901 – 17 January 1975) was HM Chief Inspector of Constabulary for Scotland from 1957 to 1966.

Renfrew was educated at Eastbank Academy and the University of Glasgow. He joined the City of Glasgow Police in 1919; and transferred to Lanarkshire rising to be Chief Constable between 1945 and 1957.

Notes

Scottish police officers
Officers in Scottish police forces
Chief Inspectors of Constabulary (Scotland)
Law enforcement in Scotland
1901 births
1975 deaths
Commanders of the Order of the British Empire
People educated at Eastbank Academy
Alumni of the University of Glasgow